Agios Pavlos (Greek: Νοσοκομείο Άγιος Παύλος) is a general hospital located in Thessaloniki, Greece, on borders of Kalamaria and Pylaia areas.

General

History

Departments

Anaesthetics Department
Cardiology Department
Critical Care Department
 Internal Medicine Department 
Dental Department
Surgical Department
Diagnostic imaging Department
Haematology Department
Microbiology Department
Orthopaedics Department
Pharmacy Department
Rheumatology Department
Blood Donation Department

Facilities
The hospital offers parking services of approximately 150 slots.

References 

 

Hospitals in Thessaloniki